Lyle Randolph "Al" Bigbee (August 22, 1893 in Waterloo, Oregon – August 5, 1942 in Portland, Oregon) was an outfielder and pitcher for the Philadelphia Athletics and Pittsburgh Pirates and end for the Milwaukee Badgers in 1922.

Bigbee's brother Carson spent eleven seasons with the Pirates as an outfielder and second baseman. They were teammates on the 1921 Pirates. Lyle, Carson and their brother Morris were all standout athletes at the University of Oregon.

In 1942, Bigbee committed suicide by gunshot wound to the head at a Portland rooming house.

References

External links

1893 births
1942 suicides
People from Linn County, Oregon
Philadelphia Athletics players
Pittsburgh Pirates players
Milwaukee Badgers players
Baseball players from Oregon
Players of American football from Oregon
Suicides by firearm in Oregon
Oregon Ducks baseball players